The 2018 Mid-American Conference football season will be the 73rd season for the Mid-American Conference (MAC). and is part of the 2018 NCAA Division I FBS football season. The season will begin on August 30 and will end on November 24. The entire schedule was released on February 22. The MAC Championship Game will be held on November 30, 2018.

Previous season
In 2017, Akron won the East Division with a 6–2 conference record while Toledo won the West Division with a 7–1 conference record. Toledo defeated Akron in the MAC Championship game.

Preseason

Preseason poll
The MAC Preseason Media Poll was released at the MAC Media Day on July 24, 2018 in Detroit, Michigan.

East 

Ohio (21)
Buffalo (1)
Miami (2)
Akron
Bowling Green
Kent State

West 

Northern Illinois (15)
Toledo (7)
Western Michigan (1)
Eastern Michigan 
Central Michigan (1)
Ball State

(first place votes)

MAC Championship 
Ohio received 13 votes as the predicted 2018 MAC Championship Game winner. Toledo (5), Northern Illinois (4), Miami (1), and Central Michigan (1) also received votes.

Head coaches

Coaching changes 
On November 22, 2018, one day after Kent State's final game of the season against Akron, the school fired head coach Paul Haynes after five losing seasons. On December 19, the school hired Sean Lewis as head coach.

Coaches 

''Notes:

 All records, appearances, titles, etc. are from time with current school only.
 Records are through the beginning of the 2018 season only.

Schedule

Regular season

Week One

Akron at Nebraska was canceled following a three-hour delay for lightning and thunderstorms.

Players of the week:

Week Two

Players of the week:

Week Three

Players of the week:

Week Four

Players of the week:

Week Five

Players of the week:

Week Six

Players of the week:

Week Seven

Players of the week:

Week Eight

Players of the week:

Week Nine

Players of the week:

Week Ten

Players of the week:

Week Eleven

Players of the week:

Week Twelve

Players of the week:

Week Thirteen

Players of the week:

Week Fourteen

This game was added after Akron's game vs Nebraska was canceled due to lightning and South Carolina's game vs Marshall was canceled due to Hurricane Florence.

MAC Championship Game

Postseason

Postseason awards

Offensive Player of the Year: Tyree Jackson, QB, Buffalo
Defensive Player of the Year: Sutton Smith, DE, Northern Illinois
Special Teams Player of the Year: Diontae Johnson, KR/PR, Toledo
Coach of the Year: Lance Leipold, Buffalo
Freshman of the Year: Jaret Patterson, RB, Buffalo
Vern Smith Leadership Award: Sutton Smith, DE, Northern Illinois

All-Conference Teams

Bowl games

Home game attendance

Bold – Exceed capacity
†Season High

References